The 1989 European Curling Championships were held from December 5 to 9 at the Sportzentrum Erlen arena in Engelberg, Switzerland.

The Scottish men's team won their fifth title and the West German women's team won their fourth title.

The event was televised on Eurosport.

Men

Teams
The men's teams were as follows.

First Phase (Triple Knockout)
The results were as follows:

Round 1
Two teams promoted to Second Phase

Round 2
Three teams promoted to Second Phase

Round 3
Three teams promoted to Second Phase

Second Phase (Double Knockout)

Round 1
Two teams promoted to Playoffs

Round 2
Two teams promoted to Playoffs

Placement Phase

Range 9-14

Range 5-8

Playoffs

Final standings 
The final rankings were as follows.

Women

Teams
The women's teams were as follows.

First Phase (Triple Knockout) 
The results were as follows:

Round 1
Two teams promoted to Second Phase

Round 2
Three teams promoted to Second Phase

Round 3
Three teams promoted to Second Phase

Second Phase (Double Knockout)

Round 1
Two teams promoted to Playoffs

Round 2
Two teams promoted to Playoffs

Placement Phase

Range 9-13

Range 5-8

Playoffs

Final standings 
The final rankings were as follows.

References

European Curling Championships, 1989
European Curling Championships, 1989
European Curling Championships
International curling competitions hosted by Switzerland
Engelberg
December 1989 sports events in Europe